Szarvasi Football Club is a professional football club based in Szarvas, Békés County, Hungary, that competes in the Békés county league.

Name changes
1906–?: Juventus SC
?-1923: Szarvasi Iparosok és Munkások Testedző Köre
1923: merger with MOVE Szarvasi Torna and Atlétikai Club
1923–1942: Szarvasi Turul Sport Egyesület
1942–1945: Szarvasi MOVE Turul Sport Egyesület
1945–1948: Szarvasi SE
1948: merger with Szarvasi MaDISz and Szarvasi Barátság SE
1948–1949: Szarvasi EPOSz
1949–1950: Szarvasi Vasas
1950–1951: Szarvasi SzSE
1951–1952: Szarvasi Vasas SK
1952–1957: Szarvasi Traktor
1957-1957: Szarvasi Hunyadi
1957–1958: Szarvasi MEDOSZ SE
1958–1962: Szarvasi SC
1962: merger with Szarvasi Spartacus SK
1962–1971: Szarvasi Spartacus SC
1971: merger with Szarvasi Főiskola
1971–1985: Szarvasi Főiskola Spartacus Sport Club
1985–1995: Szarvasi Vasas Spartacus SE
1995–2018: Szarvasi Football Club
2019– present: Szarvasi Football Club 1905

External links
 Profile on Magyar Futball

References

Football clubs in Hungary
Association football clubs established in 1905
1905 establishments in Hungary